Pankisi or the Pankisi Gorge (Pankisis Kheoba) is a valley region in Georgia, in the upper reaches of River Alazani just south of Georgia’s historic region of Tusheti between Mt Borbalo and the ruined 17th-century fortress of Bakhtrioni. Administratively, it is included in the Akhmeta municipality of the Kakheti region. An ethnic group called Kists of Chechen roots form the majority (75%) in the area.

Area conditions

It had allegedly often been used as a base for transit, training and shipments of arms and financing by Chechen rebels and Islamic militants, including foreign fighters, many of whom followed Ruslan Gelayev. Most of these accusations were around 2002, but others allege that it is more peaceful now, although there are still many Chechen refugees living there. 

The former senior Islamic State leader Tarkan Batirashvili, otherwise known as "Omar the Chechen", grew up in the area where some of his family still lives. In 2014, Batirashvilii reportedly threatened to return to the area to lead a Muslim attack on Russian Chechnya, however such a threat never came into fruition as he was killed during a battle in the town of Al-Shirqat in Iraq of 2016.

Cultural references
The situation in the Pankisi Gorge received an extensive fictional treatment factoring into several of the popular John Ringo anti-terrorism military science fiction books in the Paladin of Shadows series.

Notes

References

Shorena Kurtsikidze & Vakhtang Chikovani, Ethnography and Folklore of the Georgia-Chechnya Border: Images, Customs, Myths & Folk Tales of the Peripheries, Munich: Lincom Europa, 2008.

External links
Shorena Kurtsikidze and Vakhtang Chikovani, Georgia's Pankisi Gorge: An Ethnographic Survey, Berkeley Program in Soviet and Post-Soviet Studies,University of California, Berkeley, Spring 2002.(http://escholarship.org/uc/item/64d7v9hj)
Rebecca Ruth Gould, “Secularism and Belief in Georgia’s Pankisi Gorge," Journal of Islamic Studies 22.3(2011): 339–373. 
Georgia Sustainment and Stability Operations Program 

Valleys of Georgia (country)
Geography of Kakheti